Paramorariopsis is a genus of copepods in the family Canthocamptidae. It is endemic to Slovenia.

References

Harpacticoida
Freshwater crustaceans of Europe
Endemic fauna of Slovenia
Taxonomy articles created by Polbot